Protodaedalea is a genus of fungi in the family Auriculariaceae. Species produce bracket-like basidiocarps (fruit bodies) on wood with a lamellate (gilled) undersurface. The genus currently comprises two species, both known from Asia.

References

External links

Auriculariales
Agaricomycetes genera